BQD may refer to:

The Building Quality Department, a Singaporean governmental department
The ISO 639-3 code of the Bung language, bqd